The Buys Ballot Medal is a prize given out by the Royal Netherlands Academy of Arts and Sciences.  It was instituted in 1888 to honour the achievements of the Dutch meteorologist C.H.D. Buys Ballot. The prize is awarded approximately every ten years to an individual that has made significant contributions to meteorology.

The recipients have been:

 1893 – Julius von Hann, Austria
 1903 – Richard Assmann and Arthur Berson, Germany
 1913 – Hugo Hergesell, Germany
 1923 – Sir Napier Shaw, United Kingdom
 1933 – Vilhelm Bjerknes, Norway
 1948 – Sverre Petterssen, Norway
 1953 – Gustav Swoboda, Czech Republic
 1963 – Erik Palmén, Finland
 1973 – Joseph Smagorinsky, United States
 1982 – Aksel C. Wiin-Nielsen, Denmark
 1995 – Veerabhadran Ramanathan, United States
 2004 – Edward Norton Lorenz, United States
 2014 – Sir Brian Hoskins, United Kingdom

See also

 List of meteorology awards

References

External links

Description of the prize
KNAW

Awards established in 1888
Dutch honorary society awards
Meteorology awards
 
Awards of the Royal Netherlands Academy of Arts and Sciences
1888 establishments in the Netherlands